Walter Oakley Hoffecker (September 20, 1854 – January 23, 1934) was an American engineer, businessman and politician from Smyrna in Kent County, Delaware. He was a member of the Republican Party and served as U.S. Representative from Delaware.

Early life and family
Hoffecker was born in Smyrna, Delaware. He graduated from Smyrna Seminary in 1872, and in September 1873, he entered Lehigh University at Bethlehem, Pennsylvania, where he studied civil engineering.

Professional career
Hoffecker was engaged in a variety of business ventures in the Smyrna area including farming, insurance, banking and canning. As a professional engineer with interest and expertise in transportation issues, he succeeded his father as President of the Philadelphia & Smyrna Transportation Co. He was also a Director of the Delaware Railroad and a member of the original State highway commission in 1917. Hoffecker's banking interest was the Fruit Growers Bank and Trust of Smyrna, of which he was President for thirty-two years.

In a special election on November 6, 1900 to fill the vacancy caused by the death of his father, U.S. Representative John H. Hoffecker, Walter Hoffecker was elected to the U.S. House of Representatives, defeating Democrat Edward Fowler. He served in the Republican majority during the last session of the 56th Congress. He did not seek reelection to a full term and served only from November 6, 1900 until March 4, 1901, during the administration of U.S. President William McKinley. Several years later, in 1908, Hoffecker was a delegate to the Republican National Convention.

Death and legacy
Hoffecker died at Smyrna and is buried there in the Glenwood Cemetery. His home Ivy Dale Farm was listed on the National Register of Historic Places in 1973.

Almanac
Elections are held the first Tuesday after November 1. U.S. Representatives took office March 4 and have a two-year term. In this case, he was completing the existing term, the vacancy caused by the death of his father, John H. Hoffecker.

See also
Politics of the United States
United States Congress

References

Further reading
Delaware Historical Society; website; 505 North Market Street, Wilmington, Delaware 19801; (302) 655-7161
University of Delaware; Library website; 181 South College Avenue, Newark, Delaware 19717; (302) 831–2965
Newark Free Library; 750 Library Ave., Newark, Delaware; (302) 731-7550

External links
Biographical Directory of the United States Congress 
Delaware's Members of Congress

Political Graveyard

1854 births
1934 deaths
People from Smyrna, Delaware
American engineers
Burials in Kent County, Delaware
Lehigh University alumni
Republican Party members of the United States House of Representatives from Delaware